The 2013–14 FC Karpaty Lviv season will be the 51st season in club history.

Review and events

On 13 June 2013 FC Karpaty gathered at club's base for medical inspection after vacations.
Due to financial difficulties, the club proposed that most of the players should re-sign their contracts with a decrease of salary, but 15 prominent players refused the proposal and were banished from the first team and left to train in Lviv. While the new head coach Oleksandr Sevidov took the remaining 16 players to pre-season training camp in Slovenia on 21 June 2013.

Competitions

Friendly matches

Pre-season

Mid-season

Winter break

Premier League

League table

Results summary

Matches

 All matchday 29 games were held without spectators because of risk of terrorist attacks.
 Originally to be played at Chornomorets Stadium, Odessa. Venue changed by Football Federation of Ukraine due to instability in south-eastern regions of Ukraine.

Ukrainian Cup

Squad information

Squad and statistics

Squad, appearances and goals
 

|-
|colspan="14"|Players away from the club on loan:

|-
|colspan="14"|Players featured for Karpaty but left before the end of the season:

|}

Goalscorers

Disciplinary record

Transfers

In

Out

Managerial changes

Sources

Karpaty Lviv
FC Karpaty Lviv seasons